Robert S. Van Doren (March 22, 1929 – June 13, 2012), better known as Bob Van Doren, was an American football defensive end who played for the San Francisco 49ers. He played college football at the University of Southern California, having previously attended Admiral Farragut Academy. Van Doren died in June 2012 at the age of 83.

References

1929 births
2012 deaths
American football defensive ends
Players of American football from Baltimore
San Francisco 49ers players
USC Trojans football players